Shitushuguan station may refer to:
Shitushuguan station (Shenyang Metro)
Shitushuguan station (Xi'an Metro)